The Sick and Suffering is the second studio album from Ace Augustine. Red Cord Records released the album on April 23, 2013.

Critical reception

Awarding the album three stars from HM Magazine, Barry Stagg writes, "Ace Augustine is stuck trying to serve two masters." Chad Bowar, rating the album three stars for About.com, states, "Their music is sometimes dark, heavy and brooding, other times melodic and upbeat ... They stay mostly in the comfortable confines of the genre box, but stretch themselves periodically". Giving the album three stars at Indie Vision Music, Brody Barbour says, "'The Sick and Suffering' starts off strong, but after about the halfway point, the record loses a decent amount of steam save for a few moments."

Track listing

References

2013 albums
Ace Augustine albums